Huang Lei (born 22 August 2002) is a Chinese footballer currently playing as a forward for Chongqing Lifan.

Club career
Huang Lei was promoted to the senior team of Chongqing Lifan within the 2020 Chinese Super League season and would make his debut in a Chinese FA Cup game on 19 September 2020 against Shanghai SIPG F.C. in a 3-2 defeat.

Career statistics

References

External links
 

2002 births
Living people
Chinese footballers
Association football forwards
Chongqing Liangjiang Athletic F.C. players